William Burnet may refer to:

William Burnet (colonial administrator) (1688–1729) British colonial administrator
William Burnet (physician) (1730–1791) American physician and political leader

See also
William Burnett (disambiguation)
William Burnet Kinney, American diplomat and politician